German submarine U-1306 was a Type VIIC/41 U-boat of Nazi Germany's Kriegsmarine during World War II.

She was ordered on 1 August 1942, and was laid down on 23 September 1943, at Flensburger Schiffbau-Gesellschaft, Flensburg, as yard number 499. She was launched on 25 October 1944, and commissioned under the command of Oberleutnant zur See Ulrich Kiessling on 20 December 1944.

Design
German Type VIIC/41 submarines were preceded by the heavier Type VIIC submarines. U-1306 had a displacement of  when at the surface and  while submerged. She had two shafts and two  propellers.

U-1306 was fitted with five  torpedo tubes (four fitted at the bow and one at the stern), fourteen torpedoes, one  SK C/35 naval gun, (220 rounds), one  Flak M42 and two  C/30 anti-aircraft guns. The boat had a complement of between forty-four and fifty-two.

Armament

FLAK weaponry
U-1306 was mounted with two 2cm Flak C38 in a M 43U Zwilling mount with short folding shield on the upper Wintergarten. The M 43U mount was used on a number of U-boats (and ).

Sensors

Passive sonar
U-1306 was one of only ten Type VIICs to be fitted with a Balkongerät (literally 'Balcony apparatus or equipment'). The Balkongerät was used on U-boats (and ). The Balkongerät was standard on the Type XXI and the Type XXIII. Nonetheless, it was also fitted to several Type IXs and one Type X. The Balkongerät was an improved version of Gruppenhorchgerät (GHG) (group listening device). The GHG had 24 hydrophones, the Balkongerät had 48 hydrophones and improved electronics, which enabled more accurate readings to be taken.

Service history
U-1306 was scuttled in Gelting Bay near Gelting on 5 May 1945 as part of Operation Regenbogen. Her wreck was raised and broken up later.

See also
 Battle of the Atlantic

References

Bibliography

German Type VIIC/41 submarines
U-boats commissioned in 1944
World War II submarines of Germany
1944 ships
Ships built in Flensburg
Operation Regenbogen (U-boat)
Maritime incidents in May 1945
U-boats scuttled in 1945